= Nanjing Soft Expo =

Nanjing Soft Expo is China (Nanjing) International Software Product and Information Service Trade Fair in short. It hosted by Jiangsu Provincial Government, Since 2005, it has been successfully held for over fifteen sessions, and became one of the largest and influential international ICT exhibitions in China. Nanjing soft Expo displayed high-tech to the world, included smart city, satellite application, 3D printing, industrial design, information security, etc., through the exhibition, enterprises are encouraged to invest.
